Luis Bernardo Guerrero Figueroa (born August 20, 1953) is a Peruvian politician. He was a Member of Congress for two periods 2000- 2001 and 2001–2006; and was Perú Ahora's presidential candidate for the 2006 national election. He was also Mayor of Cajamarca from 1993 to 1998 and President of the Association of Municipalities of Peru, from 1996 to 1999.

External links
Perú Ahora's site

1953 births
Living people
People from Chota Province
Peru Now politicians
We Are Peru politicians
Members of the Congress of the Republic of Peru
Candidates for President of Peru
Mayors of Cajamarca